The Horda Tunnel is a road tunnel in Ullensvang Municipality in Vestland county, Norway. The tunnel is a spiral tunnel, turning almost a complete circle while continuously traversing a gradient of 7%. The tunnel was built to replace a narrow section of road that was made up of many hairpin turns.

See also
List of spiral tunnels and tunnels on a curved alignment

References

Ullensvang
Road tunnels in Vestland